Montserrado-8 is an electoral district for the elections to the House of Representatives of Liberia. The district covers the Monrovia communities of Bassa Community, Bernard Quarters, Bishop Brooks, Buzzi Quarters, Capitol Hill, Crown Hill, Jallah Town, Maternity Community, Rock Spring Valley, Plumkor, Saye Town Slipway, Soniwein and Warwein, as well as the western parts of Cooper Clinic and Ocean View communities. The 12th Street constitutes the boundary between Montserrado-8 and Montserrado-9.

Elected representatives

References

Electoral districts in Liberia